Batudaka is an island of the Central Sulawesi province, located in the Gulf of Tomini. The largest island in the Togian archipelago, it has a land area of over 110 square kilometers with smaller islands) and is divided administratively into villages which form the Batudaka District of the Tojo Una-Una Regency.

Geography
It is located in the Gulf of Tomini, separated from the island of Togean by only a narrow strait. The island has a forested, slightly hilly interior with a maximum elevation of 351 meters. Its land area is 151.91 square kilometers (including smaller offshore islands).

Demographics
The island forms the main part of the Batudaka district.

The populace largely consists of the Bajo people, referred locally as "boat men".

Economy
The island attracts domestic and foreign tourists, and has seven guesthouses with a combined total of 57 rooms in Wakai. There is a single cash office of Central Sulawesi Bank as well.

The island is accessible from either Gorontalo (12 hour trip), Ampana or Luwuk (both 4 hour trips) by speedboat. A hospital is also on the island.

Agriculture is an important sector, with coconuts, cloves, corn and cocoa beans taking up the largest cultivation areas. Two markets - one daily and the other weekly - serve the local population.

Notes

References

Islands of Central Sulawesi
Populated places in Central Sulawesi
Landforms of Central Sulawesi